Chemelil is a town in Kisumu County, Kenya. It is part of Muhoroni District. Chemelil has a railway station along the Nairobi-Kisumu Railway between the stations of Kibigori and Muhoroni. The town is located 40 kilometres east of Kisumu, the county capital. Muhoroni, another town, is located 10 kilometres east of Chemelil.

Chemelil is home to Chemelil Sugar Company. The latter also owns Chemelil Sugar FC, a football club playing in the Kenyan Premier League. Its home ground is Chemelil Sports Complex.

The educational facilities in Chemelil include Chemelil Academy, Chemelil Factory Primary School, and Chemelil Sugar Primary School. Chemelil is a home for many since many settlers land there for work.

References

Kisumu County
Populated places in Nyanza Province